Palaja is a small French town, located in the department of Aude in Occitanie region. It is part of the urban area of Carcassonne.

At the last census in 2015, Palaja had 2,277 inhabitants - called the Palajanese. Because of its proximity to the medieval city of Carcassonne and its privileged environment, the municipality of Palaja is renowned for its living environment, hiking trails and the many possible activities within a radius of five kilometres (golf, beach, acrobatic park, water sports centre, Australian park...). It represents the wealthy suburbs of Carcassonne.

Population

See also
Communes of the Aude department

References

Communes of Aude
Aude communes articles needing translation from French Wikipedia